St. Michael is a hamlet in central Alberta, Canada within Lamont County.

Demographics 
St. Michael recorded a population of 39 in the 1991 Census of Population conducted by Statistics Canada.

See also 
List of communities in Alberta
List of hamlets in Alberta

References 

Hamlets in Alberta
Lamont County